Norman Jordan (7 September 1888 – 4 September 1937) was a cricketer. He played in two first-class matches for British Guiana in 1908/09 and 1909/10.

See also
 List of Guyanese representative cricketers

References

External links
 

1888 births
1937 deaths
Cricketers from British Guiana